S. P. Sangliyana is a 1990 Kannada action drama film, directed and written by P. Nanjundappa. It is a sequel to the 1988 film Sangliyana. The film stars Shankar Nag, Bhavya and Shivaranjani in the lead roles. The film was produced under Swarnagiri Movies banner and the music was scored and composed by Hamsalekha. The film was dubbed into Telugu as Police Belt.

Cast 

 Shankar Nag as S. P. Sangliana
 Bhavya as Kanchana Sangliana
 Shivaranjani as Ranjani
 Devaraj as Vikram Vicky
 Ashok as Police Commissioner
 Mukhyamantri Chandru as Dhanraj
 Vajramuni MLA Nagappa
 Master Manjunath as Avinash
 Kunigal Nagabhushan
 Jai Jagadish Inspector Kiran (extended cameo appearance)
 Shashikumar Fake CBI Officer
 Avinash as Fake CBI Officer
 Lohithaswa as Mahesh 
 Sudheer as Kumbhi
 Mysore Lokesh
 Lakshmi Chandrashekar
 Negro Johnny

Soundtrack 

The music was composed and the lyrics were written by Hamsalekha. The album consists of five tracks.

References

External links 
 
 video

1990 films
1990s Kannada-language films
Indian action drama films
1990s masala films
Indian biographical drama films
Films scored by Hamsalekha
Indian sequel films
Fictional portrayals of the Karnataka Police
1990s biographical drama films
1990 drama films
1990s action drama films